Wrestlers from the Iran have taken part in most of the major men's freestyle wrestling competitions over the years, in particular the Olympic Games and World Wrestling Championships.

Iran first participated at the Olympic Games in 1948, and has sent wrestlers to compete in every Summer Olympic Games since then, except for 1980 and 1984 due to boycotts. Iran also did not send wrestlers to the World Championships in 1979, 1983, 1986, and 1987.

1948–1961

1962–1968

1969–1996

1997–2001

2002–2013

2014–2017

* 61 kg and 70 kg were non-Olympic weights and were therefore wrestled at the 2016 World Wrestling Championships.

2018–

See also
List of World and Olympic Champions in men's freestyle wrestling
List of Cadet, Junior, and Espoir World Champions in men's freestyle wrestling
List of Iran national freestyle wrestling medalists
Iranian results in men's Greco-Roman wrestling
Soviet and Russian results in men's freestyle wrestling
United States results in men's freestyle wrestling

References

UWW Database

Wrestling in Iran
Freestyle wrestling
Iran Freestyle Mens